Ross Graham may refer to:
 Ross Graham (rugby union)
 Ross Graham (footballer)